Dereck Kutesa (born 6 December 1997) is a Swiss professional footballer who plays as a winger for Servette.

Club career
Kutesa played his youth football by Servette and advanced through all the ranks. On 18 October 2013 he signed his first professional contract, a three-year deal, but he remained with their U-21 team. During the 2014–15 season he was called up to their first team and had four appearances with them in the Challenge League, the second tier of Swiss football. At the end of the season Servette were second in the table, but they did not obtain a license for the 2015-16 Challenge League season because they did not provide necessary financial documents and guarantees. Servette was therefore relegated to the Promotion League, the third tier.

On 30 December 2015 Kutesa signed for Basel on a three and a half year contract. He prepared himself for the second half of the season in January with Basel and was loaned back to his regular club Servette until the end of the season. With Kutesa's help they achieved immediate promotion.

On 1 July 2016 Kutesa joined Basel's first team for their 2016–17 season under head coach Urs Fischer. After playing in five test games Kutesa played his debut for the club in the Swiss Cup away game in the Herti Allmend Stadion on 18 September 2016 as Basel won 1–0 against Zug 94. He played his domestic league debut for the club in the away game in the Rheinpark Stadion on 5 March 2017 as Basel played a 1–1 draw with Vaduz. Under trainer Urs Fischer Kutesa won the Swiss Super League championship at the end of the 2016–17 season. For the club this was the eighth title in a row and their 20th championship title in total. They also won the Swiss Cup for the twelfth time, which meant they had won the double for the sixth time in the club's history. Kutesa played in two of the cup games.

On 14 September 2017, Basel announced that they were loaning out Kutesa to FC Luzern, until the end of the 2017–18 Swiss Super League season, so that he could gain more first team playing experience. Following this loan period he returned to Basel. But on 5 July 2018 he transferred to St. Gallen. During his short period with the club, Kutesa played a total of nine games for Basel without scoring a goal. Four of these games were in the Swiss Super League, three in the Swiss Cup and nine were friendly games.

During summer 2018, on 5 July, Kutesa transferred to St. Gallen, where he stayed for just one season, in which he played a total of 45 competitive games for FCSG. In these he scored five goals and made five assists. On 27 August 2019 the club announced that he was transferring to French team Stade de Reims in the Ligue 1.

On 25 August 2021, he joined Zulte Waregem in Belgium for a season-long loan.

On 30 August 2022, Kutesa returned to Servette and signed a three-year contract.

International career
Kutesa is of Angolan descent. He participated in the 2014 UEFA European Under-17 Championship with the Switzerland national under-17 football team.

Honours
Basel
 Swiss Super League: 2016–17
 Swiss Cup winner: 2016–17

References

External links
 

1997 births
Living people
Footballers from Geneva
Swiss men's footballers
Switzerland youth international footballers
Switzerland under-21 international footballers
Association football wingers
Servette FC players
FC Basel players
FC Luzern players
FC St. Gallen players
Stade de Reims players
S.V. Zulte Waregem players
Swiss Challenge League players
Swiss Super League players
Ligue 1 players
Belgian Pro League players
Championnat National 2 players
Swiss people of Angolan descent
Swiss sportspeople of African descent
Swiss expatriate footballers
Swiss expatriate sportspeople in France
Expatriate footballers in France
Swiss expatriate sportspeople in Belgium
Expatriate footballers in Belgium